A list of EuroCity services, past and present. Routes are described from north-west to south-east. Unnamed services are listed alongside named services on similar routes.

Key

List of services

Notes

References

Deutsche Bahn, Ihr Zugbegleiter/Ihr Reiseplan, Editions 1987 up to 2007
Thomas Cook Continental Timetable, 31 May – 30 June 1987
M. Mertens and J.P. Malaspina, La légende des Trans Europ Express, Vannes 2007
Fernbahn
Reisezüge
Vagonweb

 
EuroCity
 
EuroCity